The 2022 Supercar Challenge powered by Hankook was the twenty-second Supercar Challenge season since it replaced the Supercar Cup in 2001. It began at Circuit Zandvoort 9 April and ended at TT Circuit Assen on 30 October.

Calendar

Entry list

Race results
Bold indicates overall winner.

Championship standings

References

External links

Supercar Challenge
Supercar Challenge
Supercar Challenge